M11 or M-11 may refer to:

Aviation
 Miles M.11 Whitney Straight, a 1936 two-seater light aircraft 
 Shvetsov M-11, an aircraft engine produced in the Soviet Union

Science
 Messier 11 (M11), an open star cluster also known as the Wild Duck Cluster
 Mathieu group M11 in the mathematical field of group theory
 Ritter M11 UltraClave, a model of autoclave made by Midmark

Transportation
 M-11, a state highway in the metropolitan area of Grand Rapids, Michigan
M11 (East London), a Metropolitan Route in East London, South Africa
M11 (Cape Town), a Metropolitan Route in Cape Town, South Africa
M11 (Johannesburg), a Metropolitan Route in Johannesburg, South Africa
M11 (Pretoria), a Metropolitan Route in Pretoria, South Africa
M11 (Durban), a Metropolitan Route in Durban, South Africa
M11 (Bloemfontein), a Metropolitan Route in Bloemfontein, South Africa
M11 (Port Elizabeth), a Metropolitan Route in Port Elizabeth, South Africa
 M11 motorway in England
 M11 motorway (Pakistan) Sialkot - Lahore Motorway in Pakistan
 the Moscow–Saint Petersburg motorway, designated M11
 Highway M11 (Ukraine)
 M11 motorway, portion of the N11 road in Ireland
 Mornington Peninsula Freeway in Victoria, Australia designated M11
 New York City Bus M11, a New York City Bus route in Manhattan
 M11 (Istanbul Metro), a rapid transit line of the Istanbul Metro
M11 Road (Zambia), a road in Zambia

Firearms and military equipment
 M11, a United States military designation for the SIG Sauer P228 semi-automatic pistol
 Ingram MAC-11, a sub-compact machine pistol
 M-11 Shtorm, a 1959 Russian naval surface-to-air missile system
 Fiat M11/39, an Italian medium tank used during World War II
 Grigorovich M-11, a 1916 Russian single-seat fighter flying boat
 Mk 11 Mod 0 Sniper Weapon System, a variant of the SR-25 used by the United States Navy
 Remington 11-87, a semi-automatic shotgun
 Panhard ULTRAV M11, a reconnaissance variant of the Véhicule Blindé Léger marketed to the US Army

Other
 M11, an abbreviation used to refer to the 11 March 2004 Madrid train bombings
 Change 2011, a Finnish political party which advocates direct democracy
 M-11 (comics), a fictional robot in Atlas Comics and Marvel Comics
 Magic 2011, the twelfth core set in Magic: The Gathering
 M11, a difficulty grade in mixed climbing